琵琶 is an East Asian string instrument.

琵琶 may refer to:

Bipa, a Korean pear-shaped lute
Biwa, a Japanese short-necked fretted lute
Pipa, a Chinese plucked string instrument
Tỳ bà or đàn tỳ bà (檀琵琶), a Vietnamese traditional plucked string instrument